The Forte class was a class of two large frigates of the French Navy, designed in 1794 by François Caro. They carried 30 24-pounder long guns as their main battery and 20 x 8 pdrs on the quarterdeck and forecastle; they were exceptionally large and powerful heavy frigates for their time.

 Forte
Builder: Lorient
Begun: 30 May 1794
Launched: 26 September 1794 
Completed: November 1794
Fate: Captured by the British Navy on 1 March 1799, became HMS Forte, wrecked in January 1801 in the Red Sea.

 Égyptienne
Builder: Toulon
Begun: 26 September 1798
Launched: 17 July 1799
Completed: November 1799
Fate: Captured by the British Navy on 2 September 1801, became HMS Egyptienne, sold for breaking up 30 April 1817

References 

Rif Winfield and Stephen S. Roberts, French Warships in the Age of Sail, 1786-1861 Seaforth Publishing, 2015, .

Forte
 
Ship classes of the French Navy